The Sociedad Nacional de Agricultura (S.N.A.; Spanish for National Agriculture Society) is a guild association grouping landowners, professionals and minor associations involved in agriculture in Chile. It is considered Chile's oldest surviving guild association.

References

External links

 Official website in Spanish

Agricultural organisations based in Chile